Mangal Pandey is a 1983 Indian Hindi-language action film, produced and directed by Harmesh Malhotra. It starred Shatrughan Sinha, Parveen Babi in lead roles.

Plot
Abused by his step-mother; Rajmer, Jaipur-based young Mangal faces more trauma when his father Havaldar Rajnath Pandey is shot dead by Daku Lal Singh. He then gets separated from his sister, Deepa, who is adopted by a drug dealer, Kulbhushan, who re-names him 'Tiger'; and then joins hands with criminal don, Jaganlal. Then he gets into a confrontation with Police Inspector Vijay Shukla and ends up killing him. Police launch a manhunt and ultimately come to the conclusion that he was killed in a train accident. He does survive and takes this opportunity to return home. He will be welcomed by a recently widowed Deepa but will face the shock of finding out that he was not only responsible for her widowhood but also had a hand in the abduction and subsequent trauma of his nephew, Munna.

Cast
 Shatrughan Sinha as Mangal Pandey / Tiger
 Parveen Babi as Kavita
 Farida Jalal as Deepa Pandey
 Kader Khan as Inspector Vijay Shukla
 Ajit as Lal Singh / Jaganlal
 Satyen Kappu as Sarju / Suraj Singh
 Jagdeep as Parwaz Mirza
 Neeta Mehta as Sushma Gupta
 Viju Khote as Kavita's molester in Pinto's Motel
 Sudhir as Sub-Inspector Desai
 Chandrashekhar as Constable Rajnath Pandey
 Iftekhar as Inspector / Superintendent R. P. Gupta
 Ashalata Wabgaonkar as Mrs. R. P. Gupta
 Ram Mohan as Sujit
 Mohan Sherry as Kulbhushan
 Yusuf Khan as Peter

Soundtrack

External links

1980s Hindi-language films
1983 films
Films scored by Anu Malik